A caiman (also cayman as a variant spelling) is an alligatorid belonging to the subfamily Caimaninae, one of two primary lineages within the Alligatoridae family, the other being alligators. Caimans inhabit Mexico, Central and South America from marshes and swamps to mangrove rivers and lakes. They have scaly skin and live a fairly nocturnal existence. The black caiman is the largest caiman species in the world and is found in the slow-moving rivers and lakes that surround the Amazon basin. There are six different species of caiman found throughout the watery jungle habitats of Central and Southern America.

Caimans are distinguished from alligators, their closest relatives, by a few defining features: a lack of a bony septum between the nostrils, ventral armor composed of overlapping bony scutes formed from two parts united by a suture, and longer and sharper teeth than alligators, plus caimans tend to be more agile and crocodile-like in their movements. The calcium rivets on caiman scales make their hides stiffer and thus less valuable than those of alligators and crocodiles, both of which have a similar appearance, but are more pliable.

Behavior
Caimans are predators and, like alligators and crocodiles, their diet largely consists of fish. Caimans also hunt insects, birds, small mammals and reptiles.

Due to the large size and ferocious nature of caimans, they have few natural predators within their environments. Humans are the main predators of caimans, as they have been hunted for their meat and skin. Jaguars, anacondas and crocodiles are the only other predators of caimans, but they usually prey on the smaller specimens. During summer or droughts, caimans may dig a burrow and go into a form of summer hibernation called aestivation.

Female caimans build a large nest in which to lay their eggs. Female caimans lay between 10 and 50 eggs, which hatch within about six weeks. Once they have hatched, the mother caiman takes her young to a shallow pool of water, where they can learn how to hunt and swim.

Phylogeny
Caimaninae is cladistically defined as Caiman crocodylus (the spectacled caiman) and all species closer to it than to Alligator mississippiensis (the American alligator). This is a stem-based definition for caimaninae, and means that it includes more basal extinct caimanine ancestors that are more closely related to living caimans than to alligators.

Below is a cladogram showing the phylogeny of Caimaninae, modified from Hastings et al. (2013).

Taxonomy 
 Subfamily Caimaninae
 Genus †Acresuchus
Genus †Brachychampsa
 Genus †Bottosaurus
 Genus †Centenariosuchus
 Genus †Chinatichampsus
 Genus †Protocaiman
 Genus †Kuttanacaiman
 Genus †Gnatusuchus
 Genus †Culebrasuchus
 Genus †Eocaiman
 Genus †Globidentosuchus
 Genus Paleosuchus
 P. palpebrosus, Cuvier's dwarf caiman
 P. trigonatus, smooth-fronted caiman
 Genus †Purussaurus
 Genus †Mourasuchus
 Genus †Necrosuchus
 Genus †Orthogenysuchus
 Genus †Tsoabichi
 Genus Caiman
 C. yacare, yacare caiman
 C. crocodilus, spectacled caiman
 C. c. crocodilus, spectacled caiman
 C. c. apaporiensis, Rio Apaporis caiman
 C. c. fuscus, Brown caiman
 †C. lutescens
 †C. venezuelensis
 †C. wannlangstoni
 †C. brevirostris
 C. latirostris, broad-snouted caiman
 Genus Melanosuchus
 †M. fisheri
 M. niger, black caiman

References

Alligatoridae
Selandian first appearances
Extant Selandian first appearances

de:Kaimane
mk:Кајмани